Discography of musician, composer and producer Kabir Sehgal.

Discography

As leader 

With Deepak Chopra & Paul Avgerinos
 Home: Where Everyone Is Welcome (Resilience Music Alliance, 2017)
 Musical Meditations on the Seven Spiritual Laws of Success (RoundSky Music, 2019)
 Spiritual Warrior: Musical Meditations on Self-Liberation (RoundSky Music, 2020)

As sideman 

With John Daversa Big Band featuring DACA Artists
 American Dreamers: Voices of Hope, Music of Freedom (BFM, 2018)

With Arturo O’Farrill & the Afro Latin Jazz Orchestra
 Fandango at the Wall (Resilience Music Alliance, 2018)

With Lori Henriques Quartet featuring Joey Alexander
 Legion of Peace (Motema Music, 2018)

With Swiss Youth Jazz Orchestra
 Transatlantic Rhapsody: Live at Jazzaar Festival 2018 (Shanti Music, 2018)

With Gil Goldstein, Fritz K. Renold, Mehmet Ali Sanlikol
 Abraham: Music for Three Faiths (Shanti Music, 2019)

With Paul Avgerinos 	
 Devotion (RoundSky Music, 2019)
 Jaya Ram (RoundSky Music, 2019)

With Regina Carter featuring Jon Batiste, John Daversa, Harvey Mason
 Swing States (Eone, 2020)

As producer 

Singles
 2020: New and improved- Alyssa Raghu (Producer)

Albums

 2011: 40 Acres and a Burro - Arturo O'Farrill & the Afro Latin Jazz Orchestra (Associate Producer)
 2014: The Offense of the Drum- Arturo O'Farrill & the Afro Latin Jazz Orchestra  (Executive Producer, Producer, Liner Notes)
 2015: Cuba: The Conversation Continues - Arturo O'Farrill & the Afro Latin Jazz Orchestra (Executive Producer, Producer, Liner Notes)
 2015: 10 – Gabriel Alegria Afro-Peruvian Sextet (Producer)
 2015: Cumbia Universal – Gregorio Uribe (Producer, Associate Producer, Liner Notes)
 2016: Presidential Suite: Eight Variations on Freedom – Ted Nash (Executive Producer, Producer, Liner Notes)
 2016: Native Land – Gwen Hughes (Producer)
 2016: Runaway Train – Joe Mulholland Trio (Executive Producer, Producer)
 2016: Shanti Samsara – Ricky Kej (Producer, Liner Notes)
 2016: Tributango – Emilio Solla (Executive Producer, Producer) 
 2016: Carlos Barbosa-Lima Plays Mason Williams – Carlos Barbosa-Lima (Producer)
 2017: Familia: Tribute to Bebo & Chico - Arturo O'Farrill & the Afro Latin Jazz Orchestra (Executive Producer, Producer, Liner Notes, Composer) 
 2017: Home: Where Everyone Is Welcome (Artist, Producer, Liner Notes, Bass, Composer)    
 2017: Jazz Tango – Pablo Ziegler (Producer, Liner Notes)
 2017: Layers of the City – Ben Allison (Executive Producer)
 2017: Maple Leaf Rag - Chris Washburne (Producer, Liner Notes)
 2017: Rediscovered Ellington - Dial & Oatts, Rich DeRosa, The WDR Big Band (Producer, Liner Notes)
 2018: Mortality Mansions – Herschel Garfein & Donald Hall (Producer)
 2018: Argentina vs. Uruguay – Gustavo Casenave & Dario Boente (Executive Producer, Producer, Liner Notes) 
 2018: Vigor Tanguero – Pedro Giraudo (Producer, Liner Notes)   
 2018: An Argentinian in New York – Pedro Giraudo (Producer, Liner Notes)   
 2018: China Caribe – Dongfeng Liu (Producer, Liner Notes)   
 2018: American Dreamers – John Daversa Big Band Featuring DACA Artists (Executive Producer, Producer, Liner Notes, Bass, Composer)  
 2018: Legion of Peace - Lori Henriques Quartet featuring Joey Alexander (Executive Producer, Producer, Bass, Liner Notes)
 2018: The Planets - Manuel Valera Trio (Producer, Liner Notes)
 2018: Mindfulness - Paul Avgerinos (Producer)
 2018: Fandango at the Wall - Arturo O'Farrill & the Afro Latin Jazz Orchestra (Executive Producer, Producer, Liner Notes, Composer, Bass, Leona, Vocals)
 2019: Meditations on the Seven Spiritual Laws of Success – Deepak Chopra, Paul Avgerinos, Kabir Sehgal (Artist, Producer)
 2019: Crossing Borders – Richie Beirach, Gregor Huebner, WDR Big Band (Producer, Liner Notes)
 2019: El Violin Latino, Vol. 3: Los Soñadores – Gregor Hueber (Producer, Liner Notes)
 2019: Hiding Out – Mike Holober & Gotham Jazz Orchestra (Producer, Liner Notes)
 2019: Little Havana – Senor Groove (Producer, Liner Notes)
 2019: Marron y Azul – Daniel Binelli, Nick Danielson (Prodiucer, Liner Notes)
 2019: Radiotango – Pablo Ziegler Chamber Quartet (Producer, Liner Notes)
 2019: Shoulder to Shoulder – Karrin Allyson Sextet (Executive Producer, Producer, Liner Notes, Engineer, Arranger)
 2019: Assembly of Shadows – Remy Le Boeuf (Producer)
 2019: Delicado – Carlos Barbosa-Lima (Executive Producer, Producer, Liner Notes)
 2019: Finding Friends Far From Home – Oran Etkin (Producer)
 2019: Jazz Tango Fusion – Julio Botti (Producer, Liner Notes)
 2019: Abraham – Gil Goldstein, Fritz K. Renold, Mehmet Ali Sanlikol (Producer, Liner Notes, Bass)
 2019: New World – Sirius Quartet (Producer, Liner Notes)
 2019: The Omni-American Book Club – Brian Lynch Big Band (Producer, Liner Notes)
 2019: Puertos: Music from International Waters – Emilio Solla Tango Orchestra (Executive Producer, Producer, Liner Notes)
 2019: Upwards – Joe McCarthy & The New York Afro Bop Alliance Big Band (Producer, Liner Notes)
 2019: Alegria – Samuel Torres (Executive Producer, Producer, Liner Notes)
 2019: Balance – Gustavo Casenave (Executive Producer, Producer, Liner Notes)
 2019: Fuelle y Cuerda – Gustavo Casenave (Producer)
 2020: Spiritual Warrior – Deepak Chopra, Paul Avgerinos, Kabir Sehgal (Executive Producer, Producer, Artist)
 2020: Swing States – Regina Carter (Executive Producer, Producer, Liner Notes, Bass, Percussion)
 2020: Raices Jazz Orchestra – Tony Succar, Pablo Gil (Producer, Liner Notes)
 2020: If the Night Grows Dark – Camille Zamora (Producer)
 2020: Festejo – Yamandu Costa: Featuring Marcelo Jiran (Producer, Liner Notes)
 2020: Strings for Peace - Sharon Isbin, Amjad Ali Khan (Producer, Liner Notes)

References

External links
 AllMusic profile

Discographies of American artists